Benjamín Hill Municipality is a municipality in Sonora in north-western Mexico.

The area of the municipality is 854.70 km2 and the population was 5,285 in the census of 2005.

References

Municipalities of Sonora